2000 inter-Korean summit was a meeting between South Korean president Kim Dae-jung and the Democratic People's Republic of Korea's supreme leader Kim Jong-il, which took place in Pyongyang from June 13 to June 15, 2000. It was the first inter-Korean summit since the Korean War 1950-1953. 
Regarding the first inter-Korean summit, the Nobel Peace Prize was awarded to Kim Dae-Jung for his work for democracy and human rights in North and South Korea in East Asia in general. Kim Dae Jung's Sunshine Policy for reconciliation with North Korea was recognized.

Overview 
The first summit was held June 13–15, 2000, in Pyongyang.  Kim Jong-il, the North Korean supreme leader, met with Kim Dae-jung, the South Korean president at the time, who received the Nobel Peace Prize for his efforts as this summit occurred seemingly as a result of his Sunshine Policy, which South Korea maintained until President Lee Myung Bak adopted a more hardline position against North Korea.

Details 
 It was the first Inter-Korean summit meeting after Korean war, and as a result of the talks, the June 15 joint declaration was announced on the last day. On December 25, 2000, the Associated Press of the United States Associated Press  published the "Top 10 News in 2000", which ranked 5th was the South–North Korea summit. The inter-Korean talks continued, and North Korea negotiated with normalization of relations with Japan and the United States while maintaining a reconciliation atmosphere.   Kim Jong Il's early visit to Seoul was foreseen, but it was not realized due to the sudden change of international situation.  In accordance with the North–South Joint Declaration arising from the first Inter-Korean summit, the North-South ministerial and military working-level talks were held four times in Pyongyang, Seoul and Jeju Island from July to December 2000. These also involved North–South Red Cross talks (three times) and several working-level contacts for North and South economic cooperation, continuing until March 2007. Kim Dae Jung, the South Korean president at the time, received the Nobel Peace Prize for successfully arranging the summit.
 However, the South Korean Government paid North Korea approximately US$500 million to attend the Summit.  This payment was kept secret at the time and only emerged three years later, causing a major political scandal called the Cash-for-summit scandal. It was later discovered that South Korea had secretly paid the North Korean Government $200 million to attend, and because of this issue 6 South Korean businessmen and officials were convicted. In August 2000, after over 50 years of separation, some members of separated families and relatives in the North and South had a reunification meeting with each other in Pyongyang and Seoul. Subsequent Inter-Korean summit talks were held and the June 15 North–South Joint Declaration was adopted.

Peace declaration (eight-point agreement)
 South and North Korea are to implement the June 15 Joint Declaration
 South and North Korea are to work for mutual respect and trust in order to overcome differences in ideology, system.
 South and North Korea are to ease military tensions, hold defense ministerial talks in November in Pyongyang to discuss ways of supporting inter-Korean economic cooperation and easing tension.
 The two sides agree on the need to end the current armistice and establish permanent peace.  
 The two sides are to create a special peace zone around Haeju in North Korea and nearby areas.
 South and North Korea are to develop cooperation in the history, language, education, technology, culture, sports, and social sectors. 
 South and North Korea are to actively push for humanitarian cooperation and expansion of the reunions of separated families. 
 South and North Korea are to strengthen cooperation for national interest in the international stage and the benefits of Korean residents abroad.

See also
 Sunshine Policy
 Northern Limit Line
 Inter-Korean summit
 2007 inter-Korean summit

Press releases
Two Koreas to hold summit (CNN, Aug 7, 2007)
New hope of inter-Korean detente (UPI, Aug 10, 2007) 
Inter-Korean summit (chinaview, Aug 8, 2007)
Korean summit postponed by floods (CNN, Aug 18, 2007)

Footnotes

References
The Second Inter-Korean summit: Four Arguments Against and Why They Could Be Wrong (quoted by nautilus.org)
Ban Ki-moon welcomes forthcoming Inter-Korean summit
Inter-Korean summit welcome
Looking forward to new aspect of Inter-Korean summit
the eight-point agreement by the leaders of the two Koreas at the end of their summit (quoted by koreanblog.com)
2nd South-North Korean Summit Joint Statement, The Institute for Far Eastern Studies, Kyungnam University

External links 

 The Inter-Korean summit:Evaluation and Tasks Ahead
 The Inter-Korean summit and Unification Formulae
 Landmark Inter-Korean summit begins with unification pledge
 The official homepage of 2007 Inter-Korean summit
 The official website of the Republic of Korea
 Inter-Korean dialogue

Politics of Korea
2000 in North Korea
2000 in South Korea
2000 in Korea
2000 in international relations
North Korea–South Korea relations
Kim Jong-il